Bernardino Panicola or Bernardino Pannicola (1581 – 10 November 1666) was a Roman Catholic prelate who served as Bishop of Ravello e Scala (1643–1666).

Biography
Bernardino Panicola was born in Monticelli, Diocese of Tivoli, Italy in 1581. On 15 December 1642, he was appointed during the papacy of Pope Urban VIII as Bishop of Ravello e Scala. On 1 January 1643, he was consecrated bishop by Alessandro Cesarini (iuniore), Cardinal-Deacon of Sant'Eustachio, with Giovanni Battista Altieri, Bishop Emeritus of Camerino, and Giuseppe della Corgna, Bishop of Squillace, serving as co-consecrators. He served as Bishop of Ravello e Scala until his death on 10 November 1666.

While bishop, Panicola was the principal co-consecrator of Francesco Barberini, Bishop of Sabina (1645).

References

External links and additional sources
 (for Chronology of Bishops) 
 (for Chronology of Bishops)  

Bishops appointed by Pope Urban VIII
1581 births
1666 deaths
People from Ravello
17th-century Italian Roman Catholic bishops